Duan Yucai (1735–1815), courtesy name Ruoying was a Chinese philologist of the Qing Dynasty. He made great contributions to the study of Historical Chinese phonology, and is known for his annotated edition of Shuowen Jiezi.

Biography
A native of Jintan, Jiangsu, he resigned his government post at the age of 46 to concentrate on his studies. A student of Dai Zhen, he divided Old Chinese words into 17 rhyme groups. He suggested that "characters sharing the same phonetic component must belong to the same rhyme group [as deduced from the rhyming scheme of Shijing]". He also suggested that there is no departing tone in Old Chinese.

His monumental Shuowen Jiezi Zhu (說文解字注 "Annotated Shuowen Jiezi"), which he spent 30 years to complete, was published shortly before his death (in 1815). Wang Niansun, in his preface to the work, says that "it has been 1,700 years since a work of the same quality appeared", suggesting that it is the greatest Chinese philological work since Shuowen Jiezi, which was published during the early 2nd century.

References
He Jiuying 何九盈 (1995). Zhongguo gudai yuyanxue shi (中囯古代语言学史 "A history of ancient Chinese linguistics"). Guangzhou: Guangdong jiaoyu chubanshe.
Zhongguo da baike quanshu (1980–1993). 1st Edition. Beijing; Shanghai: Zhongguo da baike quanshu chubanshe.

External links
On-line edition of Annotated Shuowen Jiezi
說文解字注 online version by Alain Lucas and Jean-Louis Schott

1735 births
1815 deaths
Chinese Confucianists
Linguists from China
Qing dynasty writers
Writers from Changzhou
Scientists from Changzhou
People from Jintan District
18th-century Chinese writers